Kalamandalam V. Satyabhama (4 November 1937 – 13 September 2015) was an Indian classical dancer, teacher and choreographer, known for her performances and scholarship in mohiniyattam. She was awarded the Padma Shri, in 2014, for her contributions to the art and culture, by the Government of India.

Biography

Satyabhama was born in 1937, in a family with limited financial resources, at Shornur, on the coast of Bharathapuzha, in Palakkad, in the south Indian state of Kerala, to Krishnan Nair, a petty businessman and Ammini Amma. She started learning dance, at a very early age, as a part-time student of Kerala Kalamandalam, under the tutelage of Kalamandalam Achutha Warrier and Kalamandalam Krishnankutty Warrier, concurrently with her academic schooling at Government High School, Shornur. After completing her 8th standard there, she joined Kalamandalam as a full-time student. That was when she started learning Mohiniyattom, under the Kalamandalam stalwart, Thottassery Chinnammu Amma, the first long-serving dance teacher at Kalamandalam, though the main focus of study remained Bharatanatyam. Chinnammu Amma introduced the young Satyabhama to various dance techniques such as adavu (basic movements), cholkettu, jathiswarams (syllables and musical notes) in Chenchurutty and Todi.
Soon, the young girl came to the notice of the legendary Malayalam poet, Vallathol Narayana Menon, the founder of Kerala Kalamandalam, who nurtured the young aspirant's skills by providing her with a scholarship with which she could pay the school fees.

Satyabhama's debut on major stage was in 1955, during the silver jubilee celebrations of Kalamandalam, in front of the Prime Minister, Jawaharlal Nehru. The next six years of study at the institution gave her opportunities to visit Singapore and Malaysia, as a part of the touring Kalamandalam troupe, where she performed Bharatanatyam, Mohiniyattam and Kathakali. After completing the course, she joined Kalamandalam as a junior teacher. She also had a stint of training from the doyen of classical dance, Kalamandalam Kalyanikutty Amma.

It was during this time, Satyabhama met Kalamandalam Padmanabhan Nair, the noted Kathakali guru, widely regarded as the master of Kathakali grammar. Their acquaintance soon took a romantic turn, resulting in their marriage. Satyabhama and Padmanabhan Nair, at the time of the latter's death, had four daughters of which two are active in mohiniyattam. She died on 13 September 2015, aged 77, at a hospital in Palakkad where she was undergoing treatment.

Positions
Kalamandalam Satybhama was the first woman Vice Principal of Kerala Kalamandalam and, later, became its Principal till she retired in 1992. She sat on the selection committee to decide annual Kalamandalam fellowships She was also functioning as the Dean of Kerala Kalamandalam.

Legacy

Kalamandalam Satyabhama quietly retired from performances at a young age of 24 to attend to her duties a teacher and choreographer. As such, she is respected more for her contributions to the dance form than for her on stage performances.

Satyabhama is credited with purifying the dance form by weeding out external influences. She modified the performance techniques so that the emotive aspect of the performance strictly sticks to Lasyam. She is also said to have revolutionized the mohiniyattam curriculum at Kerala Kalamandalam which is said to have resulted in the evolution of Kalamandalam style mohiniyattam. She also tried to add more spice into the presentation of the dance form by evoking drama through exaggerated body kinetics through mudras (palm and finger gestures), poses and steps, which at times, have also attracted criticism.

Another major contribution of Satyabhama is the changes she has brought to the mohiniyattam costumes. The designs she has created follows Kerala traditions in color, pattern and accessories and have become the signature of Kalamandalam style. She also changed the way the dancer styles the hair, which was vaguely adapted from Raja Ravi Varma paintings.

She also left a rich legacy of 35 mohiniyattom compositions, the details of which are narrated in her book, Mohiniyattam - History, Techniques and Performance.

Awards and recognitions
Satyabhama was honored with several awards and recognitions by regional and national bodies. Apart from the prestigious Padma Shri Award, she was the first to receive the Nruthya Natya Puraskaram of the Government of Kerala in 2005 and the first Swati Tirunal Puraskaram by Kollam Kathakali Club and Ttroupe, in 2006.
Some of the notable awards bestowed on Satyabhama are:
 Padma Shri - 2014
 Kerala Sangeetha Nataka Akademi Fellowship - 2007
 Kerala Sangeetha Nataka Akademi Award - 1976
 Sangeet Natak Akademi Award, New Delhi - 1994
 Nruthya Natya Puraskaram of the Government of Kerala- 2005
 Kerala Kalamandalam Award - 1988
 Swati Tirunal Puraskaram
 Shadkala Govinda Marar Award - 2013

Kerala Kalamandalam has instituted an award, in honor of Satyabhama, which is distributed to deserving students of mohiniyattam, in the form of a scholarship annually.

Publications
Satyabhama has published a treatise on Mohiniyattam in Malayalam, by name, Mohiniyattam - History, Techniques and Performance which is considered a referral book on the subject and consists of 11 chapters and 35 compositions by the writer.

See also

 Kalamandalam Padmanabhan Nair
 Kalamandalam Kalyanikutty Amma
 Mohiniyattam

References

External links
 Profile on Kerala Tourism web site
 Reference on Narthaki.com
 Satyabhama Award recipient
 Honouring Satyabhama 1
 Honouring Satyabhama 2

1937 births
Date of birth missing
2015 deaths
Recipients of the Padma Shri in arts
Malayali people
People from Palakkad district
Performers of Indian classical dance
Mohiniyattam exponents
Recipients of the Sangeet Natak Akademi Award
Dancers from Kerala
20th-century Indian dancers
20th-century Indian women artists
Women artists from Kerala
Indian female classical dancers
Recipients of the Kerala Sangeetha Nataka Akademi Fellowship
Recipients of the Kerala Sangeetha Nataka Akademi Award